Habrotrochidae is a family of rotifers belonging to the order Bdelloida.

Genera:
 Habrotrocha Bryce, 1910 
 Otostephanos Milne, 1916 
 Scepanotrocha Bryce, 1910

References

Bdelloidea
Rotifer families